Sphaeropteris cooperi,  synonym Cyathea cooperi, also known as  lacy tree fern, scaly tree fern, or Cooper's tree fern, is a tree fern native to Australia, in New South Wales and Queensland.

Description
The apex of the trunk and unfurling crosiers are particularly attractive, covered as they are with conspicuous long, silky, straw colored scales. It can also very rarely be found in the colour of a pale pink with an orange stripe going down the middle. This is extremely rare and can be worth about 2,000 dollars.

Cultivation 
Sphaeropteris cooperi is one of the most commonly cultivated tree ferns as an ornamental plant. It is used in gardens and public landscaping. It is hardy and easy to grow. Heavy frosts may kill the fronds, but plants recover quickly. The plant prefers protected, shady moist conditions but can be grown in sunny areas. It does not do well in full sun and must be well watered. It does not grow in its optimal form in full sun.

Under its synonym Cyathea cooperi it has received the Royal Horticultural Society's Award of Garden Merit.

It is sometimes mislabeled in the nursery industry as "Cyathea australis" (a synonym of Alsophila australis).

Habitat
It has naturalised in Western Australia, South Australia, and parts of New South Wales where it is not native. It has also naturalized in New Zealand, South Africa, Tanzania, the Mascarene Islands, the Azores, Madeira and Hawaii, where it is classified as an invasive species.

Gallery

References

Further reading
 Notes on the Status of an Invasive Australian Tree Fern (Cyathea cooperi) in Hawaiian Rain Forests. A. C. Medeiros, L. L. Loope, T. Flynn, S. J. Anderson, L. W. Cuddihy, K. A. Wilson. American Fern Journal, Vol. 82, No. 1 (Jan. - Mar., 1992), pp. 27–33. 

cooperi
Ferns of Australia
Flora of New South Wales
Flora of Queensland
Trees of Australia
Trees of mild maritime climate
Garden plants of Australia
Ornamental trees